Mitchel Michaelis (born 1 July 1993) is a Dutch footballer who plays as a goalkeeper for Tweede Divisie club Koninklijke HFC.

Club career
He made his Eerste Divisie debut for Volendam on 21 September 2018 in a game against Jong PSV, as a half-time substitute for Jordi van Stappershoef.

In May 6 2021, Michaelis joined to Tweede Divisie club Koninklijke HFC.

References

External links
 

1993 births
People from Den Helder
Living people
Dutch footballers
Association football goalkeepers
Eerste Divisie players
Derde Divisie players
FC Volendam players
Go Ahead Eagles players
Koninklijke HFC players
HVV Hollandia players
Footballers from North Holland